

Events

Publications 
Emmanuel Adriaenssen – Pratum musicum, a collection of lute music for solo and ensemble, published in Antwerp
Giammateo Asola
 (Venice: Angelo Gardano)
... (Venice: Giacomo Vincenti & Ricciardo Amadino)
Girolamo Belli –  (The Loving Thefts), second book of madrigals for six voices (Venice: Angelo Gardano), contains compositions based on quotes from famous madrigals
Giulio Belli – Canzonettas for four voices (Venice: Angelo Gardano)
Girolamo Conversi – First book of madrigals for six voices (Venice: heirs of Girolamo Scotto)
Camillo Cortellini – Second book of madrigals for five voices (Bologna: Giovanni Rossi)
Girolamo Dalla Casa – , 2 vols. (Venice: Angelo Gardano)
Giovanni Dragoni – First book of madrigals for six voices (Venice: heirs of Girolamo Scotto)
Vincenzo Galilei
Fronimo Dialogo, revised edition (Venice: heirs of Girolamo Scotto)
 for two voices or instruments (Florence: Giorgio Marescotti)
Francisco Guerrero – Vespers (Rome: Domenico Basa)
Marc'Antonio Ingegneri – Fourth book of madrigals for five voices (Venice: Angelo Gardano)
Paolo Isnardi – Lamentations and Benedictus for four voices (Venice: heirs of Girolamo Scotto)
Orlande de Lassus
 for five voices (Munich: Adam Berg), a setting of the penitential psalms
 for three, four, five, six, and ten voices (Paris: Le Roy & Ballard), a collection of chansons and madrigals
Cristofano Malvezzi – First book of madrigals for six voices (Venice: heirs of Girolamo Scotto)
Luca Marenzio
Second book of madrigals for six voices (Venice: Angelo Gardano)
Fourth book of madrigals for five voices (Venice: Giacomo Vincenti & Ricciardo Amadino)
Rinaldo del Mel
First book of madrigals for six voices (Venice: Angelo Gardano)
First book of madrigals for five voices (Venice: heirs of Girolamo Scotto)
Claudio Merulo – First book of motets for four voices (Venice: Angelo Gardano)
Philippe de Monte – Fifth book of madrigals for six voices (Venice: Angelo Gardano)
Claudio Monteverdi – First book of canzonettas for three voices (Venice: Giacomo Vincenti & Ricciardo Amadino)
Jakob Paix -  for four voices (Lauingen, Leonhard Reinmichel)
Giovanni Pierluigi da Palestrina – Fifth book of motets for five voices (Rome: Alessandro Gardano)
Benedetto Pallavicino – Second book of madrigals for five voices (Venice: Angelo Gardano)
Giovanni Battista Pinello di Ghirardi
 for five, eight, ten, and more voices (Dresden: Matthäus Stöckel)
 (New Entertaining German Songs) for five voices (Dresden: Matthäus Stöckel)

Classical music 
Paschal de l'Estocart – Ecce quam bonum et quam jucundum

Births 
May 27 – Michael Altenburg, German baroque composer (died 1640)
date unknown 
Francisco Correa de Arauxo, Spanish organist, composer, and theorist (died 1654)
Andreas Berger, German composer (died 1656)
Daniel Friderici, German cantor, conductor, and composer (died 1638)

Deaths 
September/October – Gioseppe Caimo, Italian organist and composer (born 1545)
date unknown 
Paolo Aretino, Venetian sacred music composer and choirmaster (born 1508)
Pietro Vinci, composer (born 1535)
probable 
Lucrezia Bendidio, Italian singer and noblewoman (born 1547)
Marcin Leopolita, Polish composer (born c.1540)

 
Music
16th century in music
Music by year